Kyo can refer to:

Anime, game and manga 
 Kusanagi 'Kyo', KOF 1994, one of the main characters of the King of Fighters series of video games
 Kyo, a manga comic created by Ryōji Minagawa in 1996
 Kyo Sohma, a character in the manga and anime series Fruits Basket
 Demon Eyes Kyo, a character in the manga series Samurai Deeper Kyo

Music
 An alias of English singer-songwriter Carol Leeming
 Kyo (band), a French rock band
 Kyo (album)
 Kyo (musician), Japanese musician, poet and singer-songwriter; vocalist for the Japanese metal band Dir En Grey
Places
 Three villages in County Durham, England:
 East Kyo
 West Kyo
 New Kyo
 another name for Kyoto, a city in Japan

Other
 Kyō Fujibayashi, a character in the visual novel Clannad
 Machiko Kyō, Japanese actress
 Kyō Noguchi, Japanese former professional boxer 
 Kiuchi Kyō, Japanese educator and politician 
 Kyo Koike, Japanese-American poet
 Kyo Yoshida, Japanese rugby union player
 Kyo Maclear, Canadian novelist and author
Hanabasami Kyo, Japanese VTuber
Kyo Kaneko, VTuber affiliated with Nijisanji

Japanese unisex given names

ja:京
zh:京